Lo Carmen (also known by her full name Loene Carmen prior to 2012) is an Australian singer-songwriter, musician, author and actress. Carmen has independently released seven solo albums in the Americana alt-country indie rock vein. In February 2022 her memoir Lovers Dreamers Fighters was published by HarperCollins. She has described the book as ‘more a cultural history than a memoir … It’s more a kind of love letter to all the musicians and women that have inspired me.’

Early life and career
Carmen was born in Adelaide, South Australia, and raised amongst its 1970s music and art community. She is the daughter of rock-jazz-blues pianist Peter Head, founder of The Mount Lofty Rangers, and has a brother Josh Beagley, a guitarist, most notably with funk band Swoop. She began performing while accompanying her father and formed a country band, The Honky Tonk Angels, followed by garage girl band The White Trash Mamas, 'torch rock' 8 piece Automatic Cherry, and Slow Hand, an 'obscure country soul covers' band. Carmen began focusing on a career as a solo singer-songwriter in 2002.

Film
Carmen was discovered at sixteen working in a Kings Cross pizza bar and cast as the "wild and haunted" Freya Olson in John Duigan's The Year My Voice Broke (1987). Her performance, and that of her co-stars Noah Taylor and Ben Mendelsohn, was described as "deeply memorable, central characters [that] are played by a trio of fine actors in the formative stages of their careers". She was nominated for an Australian Film Institute Best Actress award for her role as Freya, 'arguably one of Australian cinema's most finely developed female characters, evoking the subtle shades of a burgeoning womanliness.'
Ben Mendelsohn calls it 'one of the greatest films I have made'. Other notable roles followed including Australian prostitute/whistleblower Sallie-Anne Huckstepp in the docudrama Blue Murder and Christine in Alkinos Tsilimidos' gritty drama Tom White, for which she also received nominations for Australian Film Institute Best Supporting Actress, Film Critics Circle Best Actor – Female 2004 and IF Awards Best Actress 2004. In 2011, director Kriv Stenders brought Carmen and Noah Taylor together again in Australian film Red Dog, which was described in the Australian as a "warm-hearted and thoroughly entertaining movie". When asked whether she prefers film or music, Carmen explains 'Making and working on music is my lifeblood and what I do every day but acting is also second nature to me. They are pretty intrinsically linked in my mind – both require commitment to getting a feeling or a character across, they just use different tools.'

Music
Carmen's debut solo album Born Funky Born Free was released in 2001, and featured contributions from Simon Day and James Cruickshank. In 2004, her second album, Slight Delay was released on Reverberation Records. Carmen also recorded a mini-album Leave It at the Door in 2003 together with Kristyna Higgins under the moniker T: Lo, it would eventually be released digitally in 2010.

In 2007 she released Rock'n'Roll Tears, co-written and recorded with Jed Kurzel and Sam Worrad. Tracks "Nashville High" and "Rock n Roll Tears" were featured in the Australian series Love My Way. It was described as "impeccably well orchestrated collection of moody, classic rock and roll pieces that highlights Loene's vocal strength and range".

Carmen's fourth album It Walks Like Love was released in December 2009. The album was produced with Burke Reid and recorded with musicians from teenage punk band The Scare and long time collaborator Sam Worrad from The Holy Soul on bass. Special guests include Jed Kurzel (Mess Hall) on duet "Oh Apollo!", her father Peter Head on piano with Tex Perkins and daughter Holiday Sidewinder also making an appearance on backing vocals. An EP Hard Candy Christmas (2010) under the name Sweet Carmo featured country classics by artists such as Dolly Parton, Loretta Lynn and Tammy Wynette. who are cited as major influences, alongside Leonard Cohen, Bob Dylan, Tom Waits and Etta James.

After relocating to Georgia while her partner, actor Aden Young shot Sundance television series Rectify, Carmen recorded and released The Peach State (2012), a suite of solo country songs, recorded in Nashville with long time Johnny Cash engineer David Ferguson. No Depression called it "...stark country-soul and shimmering blues ...a direct line to the heart that showcases her glorious voice." This release also marked the professional name change from Loene Carmen to Lo Carmen.

In 2013, Carmen released the album The Apple Don't Fall Far from the Tree, a collaboration with her father Peter Head. It was described as "an album high on smoky atmosphere and the ghosts of many a raised glass" and "an endearing mix of country soul and late night jazz". During the subsequent tour, the duo opened for Kinky Friedman and The Handsome Family.

In 2015 she released sixth album Everyone You Ever Knew (Is Coming Back To Haunt You) that features the title track as a single. The album was self-produced and recorded in Sydney over one day by Wade Keighran with musicians Ken Gormly from The Cruel Sea, Cec Condon from The Mess Hall on drums and Sam Worrad on guitar. Global Texan Chronicles called it "shadowy and palpable Lou Reed-esque honky tonk realism with so much rare and raw individuality that it takes you aback at first listen", and described Carmen as "a true storyteller". Pan Magazine described it as "true to all of Carmen's creations, it's distinguished by her ability to summon a decade-defying sound and wind up in a world of her own making.' The album includes a song written about mysterious Blue Note jazz pianist Jutta Hipp. Aden Young filmed, directed and edited the videoclip for the single on a farm in Griffin, Georgia.

First single "Last Thing I'll Remember" from seventh studio album Lovers Dreamers Fighters was released on 1 September 2017. Glide Magazine described it as 'gorgeous twangy pedal steel, sensual vocals, haunting guitar and harmonies, and a drumbeat that conveys a quiet loneliness'
A music video for second single 'Sometimes Its Hard (feat. Bonnie 'Prince' Billy)' was released on 26 October 2017. The video was co-directed by Get Out cinematographer Toby Oliver. 'Lovers Dreamers Fighters'was released on 10 November 2017 to very positive reviews.

Carmen performs solo or with a rotating line-up of musicians and has opened for Gareth Liddiard (The Drones), Renee Geyer and The Secret Sisters in Australia as well as Mick Harvey in Europe. She showcased solo at SxSW in 2009 and 2016. In band mode she has opened for Beasts of Bourbon, Magnolia Electric Company, Mess Hall, The Drones, Paul Kelly and the Dirty Three. In an interview she explained "I prefer to have a core band that I can play with but I'm not a machine playing all the time so when I need people I just have to hope they are available. Plus, I like the idea of being like Chuck Berry, just picking up bands in every town or for different gigs. And that way the songs sound different each time too". She records more than performing live, stating "Making albums is the absolute joy of being a musician for me, especially the joy of recording with other people and the surprises of what they bring."

Writing
Carmen has published essays in Neighborhood Paper and the anthologies Meanjin on Rock 'n' Roll: All Yesterday's Parties, and in Your Mother Would be Proud: True Tales of Mayhem and Misadventure (edited by Jenny Valentish & Tamara Sheward), and contributed to two of the Women of Letters collections (edited by Marieke Hardy and Michaela McGuire)'.

Discography
Studio albums
 Born Funky Born Free (2002)
 Slight Delay (2004)
 Rock'n'Roll Tears (2007)
 It Walks Like Love (2009)
 Everyone You Ever Knew (Is Coming Back To Haunt You) (2015)
 Lovers Dreamers Fighters (2017)

Collaborative albums
 The Apple Don't Fall Far From The Tree (2013), with Peter Head

Singles and EPs
 The Peach State EP (2012)
 "The Last Thing I'll Remember" (2017)
 "Sometimes Its Hard (feat. Bonnie 'Prince' Billy)" (2017)

Other releases
 Slow Burner – Automatic Cherry (1996)
 Fateful Gaze – The Charismatics (1998)
 Leave It at the Door – T: Lo (2010; digital release)
 Hard Candy Christmas – Sweet Carmo (2011; digital release/limited edition of 25)

Guest appearances
 Three Legged Dog – Cruel Sea (1994)
 Gas Food and You – The Stepfords (1994)
 Intoxicated Man – Mick Harvey (1995)
 Pink Elephants – Mick Harvey (1997)
 Stardust Five – Stardust Five (2006)
 Bang! – The Wallbangers (2007)
 Tribute to Rowland S. Howard – Various Artists (2007)
 Devils Elbow – Mess Hall (2007)
 Damn You, Ra – The Holy Soul (2009)
 RocKwiz Duets: With A Little Help From Our Friends Vol. 4 – Various Artists (2013)
 Sunnyholt – Perry Keyes (2015)

Selected filmography
 The Year My Voice Broke (1987)
 The Nostradamus Kid (1993)
 Blue Murder (1995)
 Heartbreak High (1997)
 Tom White (2004)
 Red Dog (2011)

Music videos
 "My Friends Call Me Foxy" (2002)
 "Nashville High" (2006)
 "Mimic the Rain" (2009)
 "The Peach State" (2012)
 "Old Hands" (2013)
 "Everyone You Ever Knew (Is Coming Back To Haunt You)" (2015)
 "Sometimes Its Hard (feat. Bonnie 'Prince' Billy)" (2017)

Awards and nominations
 1987: Australian Film Institute Awards nomination for Best Actress (The Year My Voice Broke)
 2004: Film Critic's Circle nomination for Best Actor – Female (Tom White)
 2004: Inside Film Award nomination for Best Actress (Tom White)
 2004: Australian Film Institute Awards nomination for Best Supporting Actress (Tom White)

Personal life
Carmen is the daughter of musician Peter Head. She has a Dutch mother and had a daughter, Holiday Sidewinder, in 1990, while in a relationship with Jeremy Sparks. Sidewinder is also a singer-songwriter. Sidewinder's godfather is actor Noah Taylor.

Carmen married actor Aden Young in Zebulon, Georgia, in 2014, after a 10-year relationship. They have two sons, Chester (b. 2011) and Dutch (b. 2007). Young directed the music videos for "Everyone You Ever Knew (Is Coming Back To Haunt You)", "Nashville High" and edited Carmen's "Mimic the Rain" clip. Carmen co-composed the score for Young's short film The Rose of Ba Ziz (2007) and also appeared in it.

Carmen watched hundreds of performances Australian soul singer Wendy Saddington gave accompanied by Carmen's father, Peter Head, since the 1980s. Since then, Carmen cited Saddington, a close family friend, as a major influence.

Carmen's mother, a film seamstress, made Chrissy Amphlett's iconic schoolgirl tunics and Carmen claims to have attended hundreds of Divinyls shows as a teenager.

References

External links
 
 
 The Year My Voice Broke Rewatched – The Guardian review
 Loene Carmen's Peach State Again
 Lovers Dreamers Fighters book review
 Lo Carmen feature in Sydney Sentinel
 Riveting, terrifying, completely singular: how Chrissy Amphlett changed the game by Lo Carmen in The Guardian

Actresses from Adelaide
Australian singer-songwriters
Australian women singer-songwriters
Australian film actresses
Australian rock singers
Living people
Musicians from Adelaide
Year of birth missing (living people)
20th-century Australian singers
20th-century Australian women singers